Duilio Vallebuona (born 6 July 1992) is a Peruvian model, television personality and professional tennis player.

Vallebuona, winner of three ITF Futures doubles titles in 2014, made his Davis Cup debut for Peru in a 2015 tie against Chile in Santiago and was beaten in his singles rubber by Nicolás Jarry. He also featured in a 2016 tie versus Uruguay in Lima, which the Peruvians won.

Off the court, Vallebuona is a model and has appeared on Peruvian television as a reality contestant on Combate, a show featuring various physical and mental tests. He was Mister International Peru for 2018 and travelled to the Philippines to compete in the Mister International pageant. In 2022 it was announced that he would be on a new Willax program called Esto es bacán.

ITF Futures finals

Doubles: 6 (3–3)

See also
List of Peru Davis Cup team representatives

References

External links
 
 
 

1992 births
Living people
Peruvian male tennis players
Peruvian male models
Beauty pageant contestants
Peruvian television personalities
Sportspeople from Lima
21st-century Peruvian people